The Bill Beaumont County Championship Division 3 was the 15th version of the competition that is part of the annual English rugby union County Championship, organised by the Rugby Football Union (RFU) for the tier 3 English counties.  Each county drew its players from rugby union clubs from the fifth tier and below of the English rugby union league system.  The counties were divided into two regional pools (north/south) with the winners of each pool meeting in the final at Twickenham Stadium, London.

At the end of the group stage, Cumbria won three out of three to stop Pool 1 ahead of Oxfordshire, who they defeated in the final game, while Dorset & Wilts made their second successive final by also winning all three of their games.  In the Twickenham final it was Cumbria who emerged victorious, defeating Dorset & Wilts convincingly, 23-13, with tournament top scorer, Mark Ireland, kicking 13 of their points.  For Cumbria it was their first Division 3 title in three attempts and first county championship silverware since 1997, while Dorset & Wilts failed to retain their title and make it a fourth win in the competition.

Competition format

The competition format is two regional group stages divided into north and south with four teams in each group. This means that two teams in the pool had two home games, while the other two had just one.  The RFU have taken fixtures from the previous year into account so that county sides that only played one home game in that competition now get two games and vice versa.  The shield competition has increased from six to eight teams as two counties, Middlesex and Notts, Lincs & Derbyshire, have returned to the county championships after an absence of several years.  At the end of the pool stage the top teams with the best record from each pool advance to the final held on 26 May 2019 which will once more be held back at Twickenham Stadium in London, having been held at the Athletic Ground in nearby Richmond the previous season.

Promotion occurs every two seasons, with accumulated points taken into consideration.  At the end of the 2017–18 season, Essex and Sussex were promoted to tier 2 with Cumbria and North Midlands dropping down to replace them in tier 3.  There will now be no promotion until the end of the 2020 competition.

Participating counties and ground locations

Group stage

Division 3 North

Round 1

Round 2

Round 3

Division 3 South

Round 1

Round 2

Round 3

Final

Individual statistics
 Note that points scorers includes tries as well as conversions, penalties and drop goals.  Statistics also include final.

Top points scorers

Top try scorers

Competition records

Team
Largest home win — 68 points
68 – 0 Dorset & Wilts at home to Buckinghamshire on 11 May 2019
Largest away win — 43 points
64 – 21 Berkshire away to Buckinghamshire on 18 May 2019
Most points scored — 68 points
68 – 0 Dorset & Wilts at home to Buckinghamshire on 11 May 2019
Most tries in a match — 10 (2)
Dorset & Wilts at home to Buckinghamshire on 11 May 2019
Berkshire away to Buckinghamshire on 18 May 2019
Most conversions in a match — 9
Dorset & Wilts at home to Buckinghamshire on 11 May 2019
Most penalties in a match — 3 (4)
Cumbria away to North Midlands on 4 May 2019
North Midlands at home to Cumbria on 4 May 2019
Cumbria at home to Oxfordshire on 18 May 2019
Cumbria versus Dorset & Wilts on 8 June 2019
Most drop goals in a match — 1
Cumbria at home to Oxfordshire on 18 May 2019

Player
Most points in a match — 19
 Dan Thorne for Berkshire away to Buckinghamshire on 18 May 2019
Most tries in a match — 3 (3)
 Doug Billam for Notts, Lincs & Derbyshire at home to Cumbria on 11 May 2019
 Connor Hayhow for Berkshire away to Buckinghamshire on 18 May 2019
 Gabe Hill for Berkshire away to Buckinghamshire on 18 May 2019
Most conversions in a match — 9
 Sam Baker for Dorset & Wilts at home to Buckinghamshire on 11 May 2019
Most penalties in a match — 3 (4)
 Rhys Harrhy for North Midlands at home to Cumbria on 4 May 2019
 Mark Ireland for Cumbria away to North Midlands on 4 May 2019
 Mark Ireland for Cumbria at home to Oxfordshire on 18 May 2019
 Mark Ireland for Cumbria versus Dorset & Wilts on 8 June 2019
Most drop goals in a match — 1
 Glen Weightman for Cumbria at home to Oxfordshire on 18 May 2019

Notes

See also
 English rugby union system
 Rugby union in England

References

External links
 NCA Rugby

2019
Shield